Bryan Lee Johnson (born December 7, 1967) is an American podcaster, actor, television personality, screenwriter and comic book writer associated with filmmaker Kevin Smith and the View Askewniverse. He is best known by his local fame in New Jersey and appearances in Smith's New Jersey films as comic book store owner Steve-Dave Pulasti. He was also the basis for the Clerks character Randal Graves. 

Through his friendship with Smith, he was often involved in his productions until Smith moved to Los Angeles. He wrote and directed one film, Vulgar (2000), for View Askew. He worked briefly at the Los Angeles branch of Smith's comic book store, Jay and Silent Bob's Secret Stash. Since 2010, he has been a co-host of Tell 'Em Steve-Dave!, a podcast created with fellow View Askewniverse staple Walt Flanagan and Brian Quinn of  The Tenderloins Comedy Troupe and Impractical Jokers. From 2012-2018, Johnson also co-starred on the AMC reality series Comic Book Men. Johnson has also collaborated with Flanagan in creating comics adapted from their screenplays, including the 2004 miniseries Karney and the 2007 miniseries War of the Undead.

Early life

Bryan Lee Johnson was born in Highlands, New Jersey. Johnson attended Highlands Elementary School there (part of the Highlands School District) and Henry Hudson Regional High School, graduating in the mid 1980s.

Career
In late 2009 Johnson began the podcast Tell 'Em Steve-Dave! with his friends Walt Flanagan and Brian "Q" Quinn.

Johnson has discussed his life and work with Kevin Smith in detail in various SmodCo podcasts, including 'Highlands, a Peephole History,' 'Why Bry?' with Kevin Smith, and 'Tell 'Em Steve-Dave,' the podcast he has hosted since Johnson created it in 2009.

On February 12, 2012, the reality television series Comic Book Men premiered, which stars both Johnson and Flanagan.

Filmography

Film
Mallrats (1995) as Steve-Dave Pulasti
Big Helium Dog (1999) as Undercover Jesus
Dogma (1999) as Protestor #1 (Steve-Dave Pulasti)
Vulgar (2000) (Actor, Writer, Editor, Director) as Syd Gilbert 
Jay and Silent Bob Strike Back (2001) as Steve-Dave Pulasti
Tell'em Steve-Dave Puppet Theater (2013) as himself
Jay & Silent Bob's Super Groovy Cartoon Movie (2013) (Voice) Shower Bully 2, Travis the Comic-Hating Bully
Shooting Clerks (2016) as Comic Book Horndog
Tell 'em Steve Dave: Makin' Clay (2017) (Writer, Voice) as Bryan Johnson
Making Fun: The Story of Funko (2018) as himself
 Cool As Hell 2 (2019) as Bryan
Jay and Silent Bob Reboot (2019) as himself, Steve-Dave Pulasti
Impractical Jokers: The Movie (2020) (Scene Cut) Biker

Television
 Clerks: The Animated Series (2000) (Voice) as Steve-Dave Pulasti
 Comic Book Men (2012-2018) as himself
 Talking Bad (2013) as himself
Bonus Content (2014) as himself
Creative Continuity (2014) as himself
 Impractical Jokers (2017, 2018) as himself
 Impractical Jokers: After Party (2017) as himself
Tell 'em Steve Dave Presents: TESD TV (2017) as himself
Tell 'em Steve-Dave Presents: ElephANTS in the Room (2017) as himself
2 Drink Minimum (2018) as himself

Comics
Karney (2005)
War of the Undead (2007)
Cryptozoic Man (2013)

Music video 
 Soul Asylum - "Cant Even Tell" (1994)

References

External links

 
 
 Bryan Johnson on the View Askew site
 "An Interview with Bryan Johnson" by Toby Carroll

1967 births
Living people
American male film actors
American male screenwriters
Henry Hudson Regional High School alumni
People from Highlands, New Jersey
20th-century American male actors
21st-century American male actors
American male television actors
Male actors from New Jersey
American male voice actors
Film directors from New Jersey
Screenwriters from New Jersey